The Lodge at Pebble Beach is a historic American hotel and clubhouse overlooking the Carmel Bay in Pebble Beach, California. Opened in 1919, the property, operated by Pebble Beach Resorts, is a member of Preferred Hotels & Resorts. Accessed by 17-Mile Drive, the lodge offers views of the Pebble Beach Golf Links.

History

The Lodge at Pebble Beach went through various names changes. It was first called the Pebble Beach Lodge. After a fire it was reconstructed, and the name changed to Del Monte Lodge. Today the lodge is called the Lodge at Pebble Beach.

Pebble Beach Lodge

The Lodge at Pebble Beach dates to 1908, when architect Lewis P. Hobart, of San Mateo, California, was hired by the Pacific Improvement Company (PIC) to design the building. A. D. Shepard was brought on as the property manager. The rustic log-cabin style inn was built of huge timbers cut from the nearby forests. Pebble Beach and the one-story lodge were announced in The San Francisco Call on May 28, 1909, with new roads that access the inn and surrounding 17-Mile Drive. 

The official opening of the Pebble Beach Lodge was reported on August 29, 1909, with a gala event at the new clubhouse. A dinner and dance at the lodge included guests William Henry Crocker and Templeton Crocker, as well as other high-society guests. During the day, professional and amateur golfers participated in a thirty-six-hole medal competition worth $295.

The lodge featured hotel staff, private patios, and a wide log pergola, positioned halfway along 17-Mile Drive, overlooking Pebble Beach and the Carmel Bay. A line of electric twenty-passenger automobiles ran from Pacific Grove the Pebble Beach Lodge. A tavern and full kitchen supplied food and drink, and later, cottages could be rented for overnight guests. The lodge operated under the same management as the Hotel Del Monte, with food service available at all hours, including fresh local abalone chowder. The lodge was built as the community center for the wealthy residents of the Del Monte Forest, and was popular as a rest stop for 17-Mile Drive motorists. Sparkling water was taken from the Carmel River and stored in a 140,000,00 gallon reservoir.

Samuel Finley Brown Morse was hired in the 1910s to manage the PIC. In 1916, Morse convinced the PIC to create a new golf course at the edge of Pebble Beach and Stillwater Cove.

Fire and Del Monte Lodge
On December 26, 1917, the Pebble Beach lodge was burned to the ground. The fire started in the kitchen from the eruption of an oil furnace. The loss was estimated at $50,000. A new, larger structure, at a cost of estimated at $200,000, replaced it, called the Del Monte Lodge. PIC decided to dismantle the old El Carmelo Hotel in Pacific Grove and use the wood to reconstruct the new Del Monte Lodge. Thirty rooms were incorporated into the building, making it a small hotel. R. J. McCabe was the new manager. 

Morse formed the Del Monte Properties Company (DMP) on February 27, 1919, and acquired the extensive  holdings of the PIC which included the Del Monte Forest, the Del Monte Lodge, Hotel Del Monte, Pacific Grove, Pebble Beach, and Rancho Los Laureles, for $1.3 million. Morse planned to use this land to develop a community within the forest centered around the Del Monte Lodge, including land for a golf course. Hobart worked with architect Clarence A. Tantau to create a luxurious multi-story hotel, and Hobart designed a signature "Roman Plunge" pool to the east of the hotel. The lodge was expanded with offices and a shopping are. 

The golf course and the new lodge held a grand opening on Washington's Birthday, February 22, 1919, under the ownership of the PIC. On February 24, 1919, the opening of Del Monte Lodge was the social event of the week. A dinner dance was held at the lodge to celebrate the opening of the new resort.

Around 1978, the Del Monte Lodge was renamed to the Lodge at Pebble Beach. The lodge has a dining room, meeting rooms, and enjoys access to the private Spanish Bay Club and the Beach & Tennis Club.

See also
List of hotels in the United States

References

External links

 Official website
 Monterey Peninsula The Golden Age

1909 establishments in California
Pebble Beach, California
Hotels in California
Preferred Hotels & Resorts
Buildings and structures in Monterey County, California